Frederick Miller was the founder of Miller Brewing Company.

Frederick Miller may also refer to:

Frederick Miller (cricketer) (1828–1875), English cricketer
Frederick Miller (British journalist) (1863–1924), British journalist and editor of The Daily Telegraph
Frederick Miller (VC) (1831–1874), Victoria Cross winner
Frederick A. Miller (d.1945), president of the H.C. Godman Co., in Columbus, Ohio, for whom the National Register-listed Frederick A. Miller House was built
Frederick Douglas Miller (1874–1961), English photographer
Frederick Joseph Miller (1891-1940), American lawyer and politician
Frederick Miller (paediatrician) (1911–1996), British paediatrician

See also 
Fred Miller (disambiguation)
Freddie Miller (disambiguation)
Frederick Millar, 1st Baron Inchyra (1900–1989), British diplomat
Frederic M. Miller (1896–1958), justice of the Iowa Supreme Court